Anno Dracula: Dracula Cha Cha Cha (re-titled Judgment of Tears: Anno Dracula 1959 upon initial U.S. release) is an alternate history/horror novel by British writer Kim Newman. First published in 1998 by Carroll & Graf, it is the third book in the Anno Dracula series.

Plot
In 1959, several of the world's notable vampires gather in Rome for the wedding of Count Dracula. Nefarious schemes are afoot and being investigated by British Intelligence, the Diogenes Club, and several others, including a British spy on the trail of a sinister madman with a white cat.

Setting
The book is an alternate history novel set in a world where Van Helsing never killed Dracula. The version of Rome shown in the book is heavily influenced by Italian filmmaker Federico Fellini. As always in the series, the novel contains a number of characters from other fictional works, though due to copyright restrictions some are not named or are given aliases.

Some of these identity shifts are quite clear (such as the character of Commander Hamish Bond, based on James Bond, who has a fondness for martinis, drives an Aston Martin, carries a Walther PPK, has the Scots version of the name "James" for his name, and gets to say "the bitch is dead."), while some are more obscure (a Kansas football player named Kent, for example).

The novel's original title is inspired by Bruno Martino's song Dracula Cha Cha (1959) (La Voce del Padrone, 7 MQ 1271), which appears on the album I grandi successi di Bruno Martino (The Great Successes of Bruno Martino - 1959) (La Voce del Padrone, QELP 8012) and is performed onscreen in Vincente Minnelli's film Two Weeks in Another Town (1962).

1998 British novels
1998 fantasy novels
American alternate history novels
Crossover novels
Dracula novels
American horror novels
Novels by Kim Newman
American vampire novels
Wold Newton family
Zombie novels
Fiction set in 1959
Novels set in Rome
James Bond parodies
Sherlock Holmes pastiches
Cultural depictions of Winston Churchill
Cultural depictions of Salvador Dalí
Cultural depictions of Charles de Gaulle
Cultural depictions of Ernest Hemingway
Cultural depictions of John F. Kennedy
Cultural depictions of Nikita Khrushchev
Cultural depictions of Edgar Allan Poe
Cultural depictions of Elvis Presley
Cultural depictions of Frank Sinatra
Cultural depictions of Orson Welles
Cultural depictions of Gilles de Rais
Cultural depictions of John Profumo
Cultural depictions of Alessandro Cagliostro
Cultural depictions of Pope John Paul I
Carroll & Graf books